Belle Creek (also Bell Creek) is an unincorporated community in southeastern Powder River County, Montana, United States. It lies along local roads southeast of the town of Broadus, the county seat of Powder River County.

The town was founded in 1968 by oil and gas developer Sam Gary in response to the growth of the Bell Creek oil field.

Climate
According to the Köppen Climate Classification system, Belle Creek has a semi-arid climate, abbreviated "BSk" on climate maps.

References

Unincorporated communities in Powder River County, Montana
Unincorporated communities in Montana